The following is a list of museums in and around Stockholm.

Art
Artipelag
Millesgården
Milliken Gallery
Moderna Museet
Museum of Far Eastern Antiquities 
National Gallery
Sven-Harrys Konstmuseum
Swedish Centre for Architecture and Design
Swedish Museum of Performing Arts
Tensta Konsthall
Thiel Gallery
Waldemarsudde

History

 Economy Museum - Royal Coin Cabinet
 Museum of Medieval Stockholm
 Medelhavsmuseet
 Skansen
 Museum of Ethnography, Sweden
 Swedish History Museum
 Stockholm County Museum
 Stockholm City Museum
 Livrustkammaren
 Swedish Army Museum
 The Maritime Museum
 Nordic Museum
 Vasa Museum
 Jewish Museum in Stockhholm
 The Viking Museum

Science, technology
Nobel Prize Museum
Stockholm Observatory
Stockholm Tramway Museum
Biological museum
Swedish National Museum of Science and Technology
Swedish Museum of Natural History

People
Hallwyl Museum
Strindberg Museum
ABBA: The Museum
Avicii Experience

Other
 Museum of Spirits
 Police Museum (Stockholm)

See also
List of museums in Sweden

External links
Free Museums to visit
Museums with free entrance in Stockholm

 
Stockholm
Museums
Museums, Stockholm
Museums